Atado a Tu Amor is the ninth studio album by recorded Puerto Rican-American singer Chayanne. This album was released by Sony Discos and Columbia Records on September 29, 1998 (see 1998 in music). It received a nomination for a Grammy Award for Best Latin Pop Album.

The album was certified gold and platinum in several countries and is considered to be one of the best-selling albums in Chile. The album's lead single Dejaría Todo was certified gold in Spain.

Album history
This album was the seventh album by the singer released by Sony Music, and was produced by Estéfano, Donato Poveda and Ronnie Foster. From this album four singles were released, "Dejaría Todo", which peaked at number 1 for two weeks in the Billboard Hot Latin Tracks. "Atado a Tu Amor", "Salomé" and "Pienso en Tí", reaching number 8, 19 and 15 in the same chart respectively.

Also featured in this album is the Spanish version of the song "You Are My Home" featuring Vanessa Williams from the soundtrack of the film Dance with Me.

In United States was certified Gold by the RIAA on February 14, 2000, by the RIAA.

In 1999, the album received a Grammy Award nomination for Best Latin Pop Album, losing to Vuelve by Ricky Martin.

Track listing

© MCMXCVIII. Sony Music Entertainment Inc.

Music videos
Lo Dejaria Todo
Atado a Tu Amor
Refugio de Amor
Salome

Chart performance

Singles

Album

Weekly charts

Year-end charts

Sales and certifications

See also
 List of best-selling Latin albums

References

1998 albums
Chayanne albums
Spanish-language albums
Albums produced by Estéfano
Sony Discos albums
Columbia Records albums